The 1970 Singaporean by-elections were held in April, for five seats in the Parliament of Singapore, after the resignation of Members of Parliament of the People's Action Party (PAP). The PAP won all five seats; with three of them in an uncontested walkover.

Background
At the time of the 1968 general election, mass resignations by the members of Barisan Sosialis in the parliament, who opted to protest and "struggle for democracy" on the streets, had effectively removed all opposition from the parliament. In 1970, however, it was five members from the governing People's Action Party who were invited to resign and give way to new blood as a part of renewing PAP's ranks.

The resulting vacancies were in the constituencies of Delta, Havelock, Kampong Kapor, Ulu Pandan and Whampoa. By-elections were arranged, with nomination day set as 8 April 1970 and polling day as 18 April 1970.

Similar to 1968 general election, no opposition parties stood except a newly formed United National Front formed from remnants of the defunct Singapore Alliance. This party stood candidates in two seats out of the five, namely Kampong Kapor and Ulu Pandan. Once again the PAP won the other three by walkovers.

Election deposit
The election deposit was set at $500. Similar to previous elections, the election deposit would be forfeited if the particular candidate had failed to secure at least 12.5% or one-eighth of the votes.

Results

References

Background of 1970 By Election
1970 By Elections Result

1970
Singapore
1970 in Singapore
April 1970 events in Asia